The 1967–68 Georgetown Hoyas men's basketball team represented Georgetown University during the 1967–68 NCAA University Division college basketball season. John Magee coached them in his second season as head coach. The team was an independent and played its home games at McDonough Gymnasium on the Georgetown campus in Washington, D.C. It finished with a record of 11-12 and had no post-season play.

Season recap

The 1967–1968 season saw the beginning of an annual series between Georgetown and Holy Cross. It continued through the 1979–1980 season, after which the rivalry between the schools came to an end.

After a strong season on the freshman team, sophomore center Charlie Adrion joined them on the varsity this season. In mid-December 1968, Magee moved sophomore forward Paul Favorite to center and moved Adrion to forward. The switch was successful; at forward, Adrion excelled on both offense and defense. In the third game of the season, at Syracuse, he led the Hoyas in scoring for the first time with 18 points. He followed this up with 21 points and 19 rebounds against Loyola, 15 points and 13 rebounds against Rutgers, 18 points and 17 rebounds three days later against Xavier, and, in arguably the best performance by a Georgetown player in a single game, 30 points and 29 rebounds on February 22, 1968, against George Washington. He scored 20 or more points in six of the last eight games of the year and finished the season averaging 17 points and 10 rebounds a game.

Eight games into the season, senior guard and team co-captain Bruce Stinebrickner was shooting 63% from the field – among the top ten in the National Collegiate Athletic Association (NCAA) – and he averaged 12.4 points and 6.2 rebounds per game this year. He scored in double figures in 16 games, twice scored a career-high 23 points, and against New York University (NYU) had 16 points and 13 rebounds, a rebounding effort matched by only two other Georgetown guards. He finished the year shooting 51.7% from the field for his career – still the second highest for a Hoya guard – never having shot under 50% for a season.

Like Adrion and Stinebrickner, senior guard and team co-captain Dennis Cesar, known for his free-throw-shooting prowess, got off to a hot start this season, leading the team in scoring in six of the first 10 games. His 25-point performance on December 6, 1967, against St. Joseph's at the Palestra in Philadelphia, Pennsylvania, in the second game of the season, including shooting 9-for-9 from the free-throw line, led Georgetown to its first victory over the Hawks since 1956. The long-awaited win prompted about 250 Georgetown students to meet the teams bus for an impromptu celebration when it arrived at McDonough Gymnasium at 2:45 a.m. after the drive back to campus.

Junior forward Jim Supple scored in double figures in 16 games, including the last seven games of the season. Among the latter were 20-plus-point performances against NYU and Fairleigh Dickinson.

The 1967-1968 Hoyas were the first Georgetown team to play at the new Madison Square Garden, meeting Manhattan there on February 15, 1968, four days after the new arena opened.

The 1967–1968 team played inconsistently all season, finishing with a record of 11-12 – the first losing record by a Georgetown men's basketball team since the 1959-60 season – and had no post-season play. It was not ranked in the Top 20 in the Associated Press Poll or Coaches' Poll at any time.

Roster
From the 1958-59 season through this season, Georgetown players wore even-numbered jerseys for home games and odd-numbered ones for away games; for example, a player would wear No. 10 at home and No. 11 on the road. Players are listed below by the even numbers they wore at home. (The following season, this practice was discontinued, and players wore the same number at home and on the road.)

Source

1967–68 schedule and results

Sources

|-
!colspan=9 style="background:#002147; color:#8D817B;"| Regular Season

References

Georgetown Hoyas men's basketball seasons
Georgetown
Georgetown Hoyas men's basketball team
Georgetown Hoyas men's basketball team